Sutherland Automotive Speedway (formerly Wyant Group Raceway and Auto Clearing Motor Speedway) is a paved oval auto racing facility just north of Saskatoon, Saskatchewan, Canada.  It is owned and operated by the Saskatoon Stock Car Racing Association Ltd. (SSCRA).

SSCRA was formed in 1954 and initially operated out of the 8th Street Racing Oval, The Motordrome, near what is now McKercher Drive and Moss Avenue in Saskatoon. The Motordrome's last year of operation was 1969, after which it was removed to make way for residential development. 

The SSCRA ran out of the Exhibition grounds grandstand in 1970, but area residents complained about the noise, dust and traffic.  The SSCRA subsequently made a deal to purchase land for Bridge City Speedway in what is now the Evergreen neighborhood of Saskatoon.

The original Bridge City Speedway, located southeast of Saskatoon, was in operation from 1971 until 2005. The city annexed the property in 2000, incorporating it into the city limits. The SSCRA was notified at that time that the land would be re-allocated for development and they must look at relocating again. 

In 2004, SSCRA acquired a new  site just north of the city limits, near the junction of Highways 11 and 12. Construction of the new 1/3 mile walled track with progressive banking began April 2005. The track opened in July 2006, a year ahead of schedule.

Sutherland Automotive Speedway has several racing classes, they are Sport Compact Mini Stock, Pro Truck, Sportsman, Street Stock, Pro Late Model, Legends, and Bandeleros, but its premier event is the NASCAR Pinty's Series. The NASCAR Pinty's series has made a stop in Saskatoon for a Wednesday night race, the Bayer Crop Sciences Velocity Prairie Thunder, since 2009.  The schedule was interrupted in 2020 and 2021 by the Coronavirus Covid 19 pandemic, but is back on the schedule for 2022 with the Leland Industries Twin 125's on July 27, 2022.

External links
 Official site
 Wyant Group Raceway race results at Racing-Reference
 Photo Gallery
 Satellite view of Sutherland Automotive Speedway (while under construction) on Google Maps

Paved oval racing venues in Canada
Sport in Saskatoon
Motorsport venues in Saskatchewan
NASCAR tracks
CASCAR